Nocardioidaceae is a family of Gram-positive bacteria within the class Actinomycetia.

References

Bacteriology
Actinomycetota